Wilhelm Melcher (April 5, 1940 – March 5, 2005) was a German violinist. He is the founder of the Melos Quartet.

Biography
Melcher was born in Hamburg,  and studied there and in Rome. In 1962, he won the International Chamber Music Competition in Venice. In 1963, at the age of 23, he became the concertmaster of the Hamburg Symphony Orchestra.

He established a standing quartet with the brothers Gerhard and Hermann Voss, as well as cellist Peter Buck. The quartet was based in Stuttgart, and remained together until Melcher's unexpected death on the eve of a planned farewell tour.

Wilhelm Melcher played a violin by Carlo Bergonzi (1731).

References 

1940 births
2005 deaths
German violinists
German male violinists
Concertmasters
20th-century classical violinists
20th-century German musicians
20th-century German male musicians
Male classical violinists
Recipients of the Order of Merit of the Federal Republic of Germany